The En-Naeem Mosque is a mosque located at the junction of Hougang Avenue 3 and Tampines Road, in Hougang, Singapore. It is built under the Mosque Building Fund (MBF) by MUIS Mosque Management.

History
The mosque was built under the Phase Two of the Mosque Building Fund in 1983. The mosque had undergone a major upgrading in 2006 which increased its capacity to 2,500 worshipers.

Architecture
It has its box-like structure and tall minaret that stands out prominently, next to the high-rise residential flats.

Services
The mosque serves the religious needs of residence in surrounding Hougang areas. It offers daily kindergarten and madrasah classes.  Muslims can also benefit from its computer classes that are jointly organized with self-help groups.

Islamic learning
Centre for Islamic Thinkers
Islamic Education Centre
Islamic Dakwah Centre
Al-Quran Learning Centre

Social development
Community Outreach
Family Counselling
Marriage Preparatory and Counselling
Volunteer
Youth Centre

Other services
 Zakat Centre
 Qurban Centre
 Marriage Ceremonial Venue

Upcoming Events
WIP

Transportation
The mosque is accessible from Kovan MRT station.

See also
 Islam in Singapore

External links

GoogleMaps StreetView of Masjid En-Naeem

1983 establishments in Singapore
Mosques completed in 1983
Naeem
20th-century architecture in Singapore